Le Triptyque des Monts et Châteaux is a Belgian cycling road race. It was first held in 1996. Since 2005, the race has been organised as a 2.2 event on the UCI Europe Tour.

List of winners

References

External links

Cycle races in Belgium
Recurring sporting events established in 1996
1996 establishments in Belgium
UCI Europe Tour races